WXZQ (100.1 FM) is a radio station  broadcasting a Top 40 (CHR) format serving Piketon, Ohio and Waverly, Ohio.  The station is currently owned by Piketon Communications.

In July 2003, the station changed to  the current contemporary hit radio radio format from the previous adult contemporary format.

References

External links

XZQ
Contemporary hit radio stations in the United States